Hypocalymma sylvestre is a member of the family Myrtaceae endemic to Western Australia.

It blooms in August producing yellow flowers.

It is found in woodlands on lateritic hilltops in an area centred around Chittering where it grows in sandy-loamy soils.

References

sylvestre
Endemic flora of Western Australia
Rosids of Western Australia
Critically endangered flora of Australia
Plants described in 2002
Taxa named by Gregory John Keighery
Taxa named by Arne Strid